Uncle John & Whitelock were a Scottish horror punk band from Glasgow. They were active from 2001 to 2006 and were noted for their live shows which incorporated elements of performance art.

History

Uncle John & Whitelock was formed in 2001 by singer and guitarist, Jacob Lovatt, and bass player, Raydale Dower. The three-piece line-up was completed with the addition of Andrew Hobson on drums.

The band was expanded to a five-piece line-up in 2002 with the addition of drummer Matthew Black and keyboard player Nic Denholm, Hobson moving to guitar. 
Denholm and Hobson left in early 2005, Denholm later moving to London to form psychedelic/powerpop four-piece The Snap Elect. They were replaced by Jamie Bolland on keyboards and David Philp, formerly of Cannon, on guitar.

The band were supporters of the charity the Scottish Association for Mental Health, appearing on their One in Four CD. In October 2005, they appeared at an awareness-raising music festival in Ljubljana, Slovenia for World Mental Health Day.

The band maintained a heavy gigging and touring schedule from 2004 to 2006, playing with bands as diverse as Franz Ferdinand,
Babyshambles and The Fall. Their final show was played on 23 December 2006 at King Tut's Wah Wah Hut in Glasgow.

Lovatt now fronts Jacob Yates and the Pearly Gate Lock Pickers; Dower, Black and Bolland play in Musique concrète ensemble Tut Vu Vu; and Philp in Gypsy folk combo Adopted as Holograph.

Music and critical reception

The band quickly built a reputation for the originality of their live performances which incorporated elements of theatricality and performance art. These performances might see the band playing on stage inside a specially constructed wooden shack, unseen by the audience, or with scratchy black-and-white, 16 mm film projected over the band as they played, giving the impression of an old silent movie.

Live reviews often focused on Lovatt's stage presence, describing him for example as a 'demented frontman', or a 'crazed urban preacher', while the band as a whole were described as 'the best live band in Glasgow' and 'perhaps the best undiscovered band in Scotland'.

The music was described as 'steel-toed subterranean rock' and 'frighteningly visceral blues', and this blues sensibility, coupled with Lovatt's distinctive vocals, led to the band being compared with Dr John, Captain Beefheart, Tom Waits and Nick Cave, while their songs were noted for their disturbing and anarchistic content.

Their recorded output was well received by critics, with their album, There Is Nothing Else given a five star review by The Sunday Herald and placed at number 18 in The Skinny's Scottish Albums of the Decade, described as a 'strange and singular work in the canon of Scottish rock'. The band were championed by DJ Vic Galloway and their records were played regularly on BBC Radio Scotland and BBC Radio 1.

Discography

Studio albums
There Is Nothing Else (2005) CD and gatefold double LP

EPs and singles
Of dis dem a know nuttin – 10" vinyl (2003) screen-printed, stitched sleeve
The Train – 7" vinyl (2004)
2 Fiddy – 7" vinyl (2005)
Riverside/1879 (2006) 7" clear yellow vinyl

Compilations
One in Four – Uncle John & Whitelock contributed the song The Train for charity release in aid of the Scottish Association of Mental Health.

DVDs
The Absurd Uncle John & Whitelock in Black and White (2006) Filmed at Embassy gallery, Edinburgh, August 2005

References

External links
Uncle John and Whitelock on Myspace

Musical groups established in 2001
Musical quintets
Scottish rock music groups
Scottish indie rock groups
Musical groups from Glasgow
2001 establishments in Scotland
2006 disestablishments in the United Kingdom
Musical groups disestablished in 2006
Horror punk groups